is a passenger railway station located in the city of Mobara, Chiba Prefecture Japan, operated by the East Japan Railway Company (JR East).

Lines

Station layout
The station consists of a side platform and an island platform, serving three tracks, connected to a one-story wooden station building by a footbridge. The station is staffed

Platform

History
Honnō Station opened on 17 April 1897, as a station on the Bōsō Railway. It was absorbed into the Japanese Government Railways on September 1, 1907. Freight operations at the station were discontinued from 1 July 1971. With the privatization of Japanese National Railways (JNR) on 1 April 1987, the station came under the control of JR East.

Passenger statistics
In fiscal 2019, the station was used by an average of 1,605 passengers daily (boarding passengers only).

Surrounding area
 
 Chosei Municipal Hospital

See also
 List of railway stations in Japan

References

External links

  

Railway stations in Japan opened in 1897
Railway stations in Chiba Prefecture
Sotobō Line
Stations of East Japan Railway Company
Mobara